Providence Township is one of fourteen townships in Rowan County, North Carolina, United States. The township had a population of 8,892 according to the 2000 census.

Geographically, Providence Township occupies  in southeastern Rowan County.  The only incorporated municipality in Providence Township is a large portion of the town Granite Quarry.  The township's northern and eastern boundary is with the Yadkin River and the township contains a portion of High Rock Lake.

Townships in Rowan County, North Carolina
Townships in North Carolina